True Blue is an American crime drama series set in New York City which aired on Friday evenings on NBC from December 3, 1989 until February 16, 1990. The hour-long drama follows the exploits of a squad of uniformed officers assigned to the specialized trucks of the New York City Police Department Emergency Service Unit.

Plot
The premise of the show was ESU, the emergency service unit of the NYPD and its handling of rescues, emergencies and SWAT team-required incidents in the city.

Cast
 John Bolger as Off. Bobby Traverso
 Ally Walker as Off. Jessy Haley
 Nestor Serrano as Off. Geno Toffenelli
 Darnell Williams as Off. David Odom
 Eddie Velez as Off. Frankie Avila
 Grant Show as Cadet Casey Pierce
 Timothy Van Patten as Sgt. Andy Wojeski
 Dick Latessa as Det. Mike Duffy
 Leo Burmester as Off. Red Tollin
 Annie Golden as Connie Tollin
 Beau Starr as Lt. Bill Triplett
 Elya Baskin as Yuri
 Joe Lisi as 8th precinct Capt. Motta
 Victor Arnold as Dep. Chief Servino

Episodes

References

External links
 IMDb.com
 EpGuides

1980s American crime drama television series
1990s American crime drama television series
1980s American police procedural television series
1990s American police procedural television series
1989 American television series debuts
1990 American television series endings
NBC original programming
English-language television shows
Fictional portrayals of the New York City Police Department
Television series by Universal Television
Television shows set in New York City